The 2008 series of Norske Talenter was the first series of the programme. It aired on TV 2 with 16-year-old singer Erlend Bratland as the winner and 8-year-old hula hoop artist Vegard F. Dommersnes was the runner-up.

Judges and hosts
Judges:
Jan Fredrik Karlsen (music producer, was a judge in Norwegian Idol many of the seasons and is going to be a judge in X Factor: Norway)
Mia Gundersen (actress and singer)
Thomas Giertsen (actor and stand-up comedian)
Presenters (hosts):
Marte Stokstad
Sturla Berg-Johansen (also be a host in 2009)

Auditions
They had auditions in Oslo, Bergen, Trondheim and Kristiansand.

Semi-finalists

Semi-finals

Final

2008 Norwegian television seasons
Norske Talenter